The 1890–91 season was Burslem Port Vale's first season in the newly-formed Midland League. They finished in eighth-place, having only picked up two points away from home. They failed to go on any cup runs and were in fact beaten by a club record 12–0 margin by Aston Villa in the Second Round of the Staffordshire Senior Cup. They did though share the North Staffordshire Challenge Cup after holding Stoke to a draw in the final.

Overview

Midland League
Burslem Port Vale became founder members of the Midland League along with 11 other clubs, including future Football League sides Gainsborough Trinity, Lincoln City, Rotherham Town and Sheffield United. The club's directors first had to deal with some legal issues, successfully defending themselves from a claim for lost wages by former player Jack Shields. In order to prepare for the new league the club signed three new players: 23-year old Welsh winger Charlie Davies, 22 year-old inside-forward James Bryden from Hamilton Academicals and 21-year old Scottish forward David Mackie; however they lost both George Bateman and Lewis Ballham to Stoke.

They opened the league campaign with three games at the Athletic Ground, beating Staveley and Long Eaton Rangers 2–1 and 7–2 respectively, then coming to a disappointing 2–2 draw with Kidderminster. Two away defeats followed, though they managed a highly respectable 1–1 draw with Sheffield United at Bramall Lane despite goalkeeper John Davies missing the train; however the team would fail to avoid defeat on the road again until 28 February. At home they recorded successive 3–0 league wins, but late December proved a disaster as they fell to 5–0 and 11–0 defeats at Lincoln City and Gainsborough Trinity; it was suggested the scoreline of the boxing day defeat to Gainsborough was such due to excessive drinking on Christmas day. New members were assigned to the club's committee and they resolved to sign better players, telling the current squad to "train or take the consequences". They lost the return fixture at Derby Junction on 17 January, but appealed the result as Junction's home secretary officiated as the official referee failed to appear; the appeal was denied.

Vale recorded home and away victories over Warwick County – winning 8–0 at home, Frank McGinnes scoring his second hat-trick of the season – but gained no points as County withdrew from the league and their games were struck from the record. Home defeats to Gainsborough and Burton Wanderers followed, but they ended the league campaign in good form, beating Sheffield United and Staveley whilst taking a point from their visit to Lincoln. They finished the table in eighth-place, though finished just five points off second-place Long Eaton Rangers. McGinnes finished as the club's top-scorer with 15 league goals. The club's directors decided to embark on a locally based strategy, signing promising local players to five-year contracts.

Cup competitions
Starting the FA Cup at the first qualification round, they progressed past Warwick County with a 3–1 away win, but lost out 3–2 to Football Alliance side Walsall Town Swifts at the next stage. They faced disaster in the Staffordshire Senior Cup, being "completely outclassed" in a 12–0 defeat to Aston Villa at Wellington Road; the result remains the club's biggest ever margin of defeat. They fared much better in the North Staffordshire Challenge Cup, thrashing Burton Wanderers 7–0 in the semi-final to book their place in the final against Stoke; they drew the final 1–1 and the two teams shared the trophy after failing to arrange a replay.

Results
Burslem Port Vale's score comes first

Legend

Midland League

FA Cup

Staffordshire Senior Cup

North Staffordshire Challenge Cup

Friendlies

Player statistics

Appearances

Top scorers

Transfers

Transfers in

Transfers out

References
Specific

General

Port Vale F.C. seasons
Burslem Port Vale